Dawid Grzegorz Kubacki (born 12 March 1990) is a Polish ski jumper. He is a member of the national team and competed at the Winter Olympics in 2014, 2018 and 2022, winning two bronze medals. He is the 2019 World Champion on the normal hill and winner of the 2019-20 Four Hills Tournament, as well as the 2017 World Champion and bronze medal winner at the 2013 World Championships in the large hill team competitions.

Personal life
Kubacki and Marta Majcher became engaged in August 2018 and were wed in early May 2019. Their daughter, Zuzanna, was born on 29 December 2020.

Career
In international competitions debuted on 25 September 2005 in the FIS Cup competition in Bischofshofen. On 14 January 2006, he scored the first points in the FIS Ski Jumping World Cup, taking 22nd place in the competition in Harrachov. On 18 March 2007, for the first time took part in Continental Cup. He was 26th in the competition in Zakopane.

2012/2013
In individual competitions at FIS Nordic World Ski Championships 2013 took 31st place on the normal hill and 20th on the large hill. On 2 March 2013 he won there a bronze medal in team competition with teammates: Kamil Stoch, Maciej Kot, Piotr Żyła. Kubacki jumped 126 m and 128 m. The primary outcome of the competition his team took fourth place, but after re-counting the scores because of Thomas Morgenstern, who noticed a mistake in points and at the request of the Germans, they finished in third place (Norway was in front of the Polish, but Bardal's jump was badly counted).

2014/2015
Kubacki took part in the World Championships 2015 in Falun, Sweden. He was in the competition on the large hill Lugnet (K-120) and was qualified to second round, but he took 29th place.

2016/2017
On 3 December 2016 Polish national team including Żyła, Stoch, Kubacki and Kot won first competition in team for Poland in history.
In Zakopane Polish team, including Stoch, Kubacki, Kot, Żyła achieved second place in team competition. On 28 January 2017 Poland won their second team competition in history in Willingen.

On 4 March 2017 Polish national team, including Żyła, Kubacki, Kot and Stoch, achieved first in history title of 2017 World Champions in the team event. They beat Norway and Austria at Salpausselkä K116 in Lahti, Finland.

2017/2018
The summer season was very successful for him. He won 5 of 9 competitions: in Wisła, Hinterzarten, Courchevel, Hinzenbach and Klingenthal. He won all the competitions in which he took off because he missed four competitions in Japan Hakuba and Russia Chaykovsky. He repeated the feat of Takanobu Okabe from 1994 (1st edition). On 3 October 2017, he won overall classification of the 2017 FIS Ski Jumping Grand Prix with 500 points. He maintained the winning streak of Poles in this tournament, repeating the success of Maciej Kot from the last year. In addition, Poland triumphed in Nations Cup classification.

Kubacki achieved good results since the very start of the winter season after winning the overall classification of the Summer Grand Prix. On 30 December 2017, Kubacki reached the lowest level of the podium in Oberstdorf, behind the winner Kamil Stoch. He waited for 143 competitions for his first individual podium. He had a chance to reach overall podium of 2017-18 Four Hills Tournament, but he lost his chance in the last jump in Bischofshofen and in the final summary he took 6th place, which was his best result in Four Hills tournament in career. On 21 January 2018 Polish national team in squad: Stoch, Hula, Kubacki, and Żyła, won the first ever medal, a bronze, for Poland in ski flying in team competition. On the same day, coach Horngacher officially appointed him to 2018 Winter Olympics. Once again, Kubacki took the third place in the competition, this time in Willingen.

On 19 February 2018 Kubacki and his teammates Maciej Kot, Stefan Hula and Kamil Stoch achieved first medal in Olympic team competition for Poland. They claimed a bronze behind Norway and Germany.

Olympic Games

World Championships

Ski Flying World Championships

World Cup

Season standings

Individual starts

Victories

Individual podiums

Team victories

State awards
 2017  Honorary Badge of Lesser Poland Voivodeship – Cross of Małopolska

References

External links

1990 births
Living people
Polish male ski jumpers
People from Nowy Targ
Sportspeople from Lesser Poland Voivodeship
Ski jumpers at the 2014 Winter Olympics
Ski jumpers at the 2018 Winter Olympics
Ski jumpers at the 2022 Winter Olympics
Olympic ski jumpers of Poland
FIS Nordic World Ski Championships medalists in ski jumping
Olympic bronze medalists for Poland
Olympic medalists in ski jumping
Medalists at the 2018 Winter Olympics
Medalists at the 2022 Winter Olympics